Patricia Mueller (born March 28, 1981) is an American politician serving in the Minnesota House of Representatives since 2021. A member of the Republican Party of Minnesota, Mueller represents District 23B in southwestern Minnesota, which includes the city of Austin and parts of Freeborn, Mower and Steele Counties.

Early life and education 
Mueller was born and raised in Oakdale, Minnesota and graduated from Tartan Senior High School. She attended Winona State University, earning her B.S. in English education in 2003. She enrolled at Minnesota State University Moorhead, where she earned an M.S. in curriculum instruction in 2018 and an Ed. D. in 2022.

After graduating, Mueller worked as a teacher. In 2007, she and her husband moved to rural China to teach English as part of a mission trip. Mueller cites her time abroad as part of her inspiration to become active in politics. Mueller moved to Austin, Minnesota in 2015, where she taught at Austin High School.

Minnesota House of Representatives 
Mueller was elected to the Minnesota House of Representatives in 2020 and was reelected in 2022. She defeated eight-term DFL incumbent Jeanne Poppe after being recruited by local members of the Republican Party to run for the seat, which had been held by the DFL since 2004 but voted for Donald Trump in the 2016 presidential election. In 2022, Mueller defeated former Austin mayor and police officer Tom Stiehm in a race that attracted considerable state media attention. 

Mueller serves on the Education Policy and Public Safety Finance and Policy Committees.

Mueller describes herself as a "constitutional conservative with some libertarian leanings". She has stressed the importance of considering the needs of rural Minnesota. Mueller has stated that Donald Trump made "it okay to be a conservative again." She has touted her endorsements from the NRA and the Minnesota Police and Peace Officer's Association (MPPOA).

In September 2021, Mueller spoke in support of Afghan refugees settling across Minnesota, saying, "As they come from a horrible, impossible place, they have experiences that can teach us and make our communities richer and make our lives better, as well."

In 2022, Muller introduced legislation to speed up the licensing process for substitute teachers in response to workforce shortages caused by the COVID-19 pandemic. Mueller has opposed state action to provide menstrual products for students in Minnesota public schools, arguing it should be up to local districts.

Mueller signed a letter condemning violence after the January 6 attack on the Capitol, but has also said that "we will never know" whether Joe Biden is "the real president." Mueller opposes state funds being used for abortions and supports a ban on all abortions after 12 weeks unless the mother's life is in danger. She supports a constitutional amendment to remove state protections for abortion access. Mueller opposes red flag gun control laws.

Electoral history

Personal life 
Muller lives in Austin, Minnesota with her husband, Dan, whom she met while studying at Winona State University. Dan was a member of the city of Austin's Human Rights Commission from 2017 to 2021, when the City Council voted to remove him due to his association with the Minnesota Family Council.

References

External links 

 Official House of Representatives website
Campaign website

1981 births
Living people
People from Oakdale, Minnesota
Minnesota State University Moorhead alumni
Winona State University alumni
Educators from Minnesota
Republican Party members of the Minnesota House of Representatives
21st-century American politicians
21st-century American women politicians
Women state legislators in Minnesota